Nico Esterhuyse (born 5 March 1984 in Windhoek) is a Namibian rugby union lock. He is a member of the Namibia national rugby union team and participated with the squad at the 2007 Rugby World Cup.

References

1984 births
Living people
Namibia international rugby union players
Namibian rugby union players
Rugby union players from Windhoek
Rugby union props